Osiek  is a town in Staszów County, Świętokrzyskie Voivodeship, Poland, with 2,001 inhabitants (2010). The town lies in Lesser Poland, along the National Road nr. 79, which goes from Warsaw to Bytom. Osiek is located 15 kilometers northeast of Połaniec, and 18 kilometers west of Tarnobrzeg, 180 meters above sea level. The town received Magdeburg rights in 1430, was stripped of the charter in 1869, and remained a village until 1 July 1994. Its main point of interest is St. Stanisław parish church, built in the late 17th century. Osiek has a rail station called Osiek Staszowski, on a secondary importance line which joins Tarnobrzeg with Włoszczowice.

Osiek is one of the oldest towns in the region. According to legends, in 1020 King Bolesław Chrobry presented the village called Ossziek to the Benedictine Monastery at Święty Krzyż. In 1253 the name of the village was spelled Ossek. It belonged to Princes of Sandomierz, and had its own marketplace. In 1270, Osiek was the property of Prince Bolesław V the Chaste. Its residents took advantage of a favorable location, along a merchant route from Kraków, through Sandomierz and Lublin, to the Grand Duchy of Lithuania. Many Piast dynasty princes would stop here during their trips across the country. Osiek most likely was a fortified gord, and in the mid-14th century, King Kazimierz Wielki built (or strengthened) a local castle.

Osiek was burned in the Mongol invasion of Poland, but the village was quickly rebuilt. In 1430, King Władysław Jagiełło granted it the Magdeburg rights, allowing the town to organize weekly markets on Wednesdays. Osiek was a private town, owned by local szlachta families. It prospered during the Polish Golden Age, when it was part of the Sandomierz Voivodeship. In the second half of the 16th century, its population amounted to 1,000, with a number of guilds, such as bakers, butchers, blacksmiths, tailors, potmakers, and millers. Osiek had 100 houses, and a wooden parish church of St. Stanisław. The decline of the town was brought by the Swedish invasion of Poland (1655–1660). Like almost all Lesser Poland's towns, Osiek was ransacked and burned, and never recovered from the destruction. Until the Partitions of Poland, it remained within borders of the Sandomierz Voivodeship, and since 1815, it was part of the Russian-controlled Congress Poland. The town further declined in the 19th century, losing its charter in 1869, after January Uprising.

Osiek was destroyed in both world wars, during the Invasion of Poland (September 1939), retreating units of the Polish Army fought here a battle with the Wehrmacht, in which app. 100 Poles died. As a result of World War I and World War II destruction, there are no other historic buildings in Osiek, except for the parish church.

Demographics 
According to the 2011 Polish census, there were 2,001 people residing in Osiek, of whom 50% were male and 50% were female. In the town, the population consisted of 21.2% inhabitants under the age of 18; 38.6% between the age of 18 and 44; 23.6% from 45 to 64; and 16.6% residents who were 65 years of age or older.

Figure 1. Population pyramid in 2010 – by age group and sex

Former parts of town – physiographic objects 
In the years 1970 of last age, sorted and prepared out list part of names of localities for Osiek, at as type of settlement then yet is a village, what you can see in table 3. Remaining not exchanged parts here are described in integral part of town Osiek now, in Osieczko.

References

Cities and towns in Świętokrzyskie Voivodeship
Staszów County
Sandomierz Voivodeship
Radom Governorate
Kielce Voivodeship (1919–1939)